Propionivibrio pelophilus is a bacterium from the genus of Propionivibrio. Propionibacter pelophilus has been reclassified to Propionivibrio pelophilus.

References

External links
Type strain of Propionivibrio pelophilus at BacDive -  the Bacterial Diversity Metadatabase

Rhodocyclaceae